George Hudson (born November 10, 1976) is a former professional Canadian football centre. He most recently played for the Saskatchewan Roughriders of the Canadian Football League. He was drafted by the Edmonton Eskimos in the third round of the 2000 CFL Draft. He played college football for the New Mexico State Aggies.

Hudson has also been a member of the Dallas Cowboys, Carolina Panthers, Ottawa Renegades and the Hamilton Tiger-Cats.

External links
CFL Players' Association bio

1976 births
Living people
American football offensive linemen
Canadian football offensive linemen
Canadian players of American football
Carolina Panthers players
Dallas Cowboys players
Edmonton Elks players
Hamilton Tiger-Cats players
New Mexico State Aggies football players
Ottawa Renegades players
Players of Canadian football from Ontario
Saskatchewan Roughriders players
Sportspeople from St. Catharines